This is a list of the Egypt national football team results from 1996 to the present day that, for various reasons, are not accorded the status of official International A Matches.

1990s

2000s

2010s

References

1990s in Egypt
2000s in Egypt
2010s in Egypt
Egypt national football team results
Lists of national association football team unofficial results